The 2021 season was the Indianapolis Colts' 69th season in the National Football League (NFL) and their 38th in Indianapolis. It was their fourth season under head coach Frank Reich and fifth under the leadership of general manager Chris Ballard. Despite having 7 Pro Bowlers and 5 AP All-Pros, the Colts failed to improve upon their 11–5 record from the previous season, after a Week 12 loss to the Tampa Bay Buccaneers. The Colts were eliminated from the postseason in the final week of the season after a stunning loss to the 2–14 Jacksonville Jaguars and the Pittsburgh Steelers beating the Baltimore Ravens the same day.

Draft

Pre-draft trades
 The Colts traded their 3rd round pick in 2021 along with a conditional 2nd round pick in 2022 to the Philadelphia Eagles for quarterback Carson Wentz.

Staff

Final roster

Preseason
The Colts' preseason opponents and results are mentioned as below:

Regular season

Schedule
The Colts' 2021 schedule was announced on May 12.

Note: Intra-division opponents are in bold text.

Game summaries

Week 1: vs. Seattle Seahawks

With their 8th straight season-opening defeat, the Colts started 0–1.

Week 2: vs. Los Angeles Rams

Week 3: at Tennessee Titans

With this loss, the Colts started 0-3 for the first time since 2011.

Week 4: at Miami Dolphins

Week 5: at Baltimore Ravens

Week 6: vs. Houston Texans

Week 7: at San Francisco 49ers

Week 8: vs. Tennessee Titans

Week 9: vs. New York Jets

This was the first NFL game that ended in a 45–30 score, making a scorigami.

Week 10: vs. Jacksonville Jaguars

Week 11: at Buffalo Bills

This was the Colts' second scorigami of the season, as a 41-15 score had never occurred in the NFL before.

Week 12: vs. Tampa Bay Buccaneers

Week 13: at Houston Texans

Week 15: vs. New England Patriots

With the win, the Colts improved to 8–6 and beat the Patriots for the first time since Week 10 of the 2009 season.

Week 16: at Arizona Cardinals
Christmas Day games

Week 17: vs. Las Vegas Raiders

Week 18: at Jacksonville Jaguars

In a shocking fashion, the Colts were upset by the 2-14 Jaguars thus ending their playoff hopes, as the Steelers won earlier that day.

Standings

Division

Conference

References

External links
 

Indianapolis
Indianapolis Colts seasons
Indianapolis Colts